Jan Lagasse is an American curler.

At the national level, she is a 1989 United States women's champion curler.

Teams

References

External links

Ссылки 
 Turtle Mountain Star January 21, 2013: Page 4 (look at right column «Pages from the past», «30 years ago, January 17, 1983»: «Congratulations to the Rolla Ladies Curling Team of Jan Lagasse, Janie Kakela, Cooky Bertsch, Eileen Mickelson and substitute Holly Heitcamp…»)

Living people
American female curlers
American curling champions
Year of birth missing (living people)
Place of birth missing (living people)